Herman Allen Blumenthal (May 21, 1916 – March 30, 1986) was an American art director and production designer for films.
He shared in two Academy Awards for Best Art Direction, for his work on Cleopatra (1963) and Hello, Dolly! (1969). He had previously been nominated for Journey to the Center of the Earth (1959).

References

External links

1916 births
1986 deaths
20th Century Studios people
American art directors
American production designers
Best Art Direction Academy Award winners
People from Los Angeles